One ship of the United States Navy and two ships of the United States Coast Guard (including its predecessor, the U.S. Revenue Marine) have been named Bibb, in honor of George M. Bibb, senator from Kentucky and briefly Secretary of the Treasury in the Tyler administration.

 , a Revenue Marine cutter launched in Pittsburgh on 10 April 1845 and transferred to the Coast Survey in 1847; her engines were salvaged for use in the next Bibb.
 , a Coast Survey vessel, occasionally attached to the Union Navy during the American Civil War, and for six months in 1861, transferred to the Revenue Marine. Retired in 1879; sometimes considered to be the same vessel as the first Bibb.
 , a Coast Guard cutter commissioned 10 March 1937.

References 
 

United States Navy ship names